Hechtia marnier-lapostollei is a species of plant in the genus Hechtia. This species is endemic to Mexico.

References
BSI Journal V11(4), HECHTIA MARNIER-LAPOSTOLLEI retrieved 24 December 2011

marnier-lapostollei
Endemic flora of Mexico